José Fernando Plascencia Castro (born 18 June 1999) is a Mexican professional footballer who plays as a midfielder for Liga MX club Necaxa.

International career
In April 2019, Plascencia was included in the 21-player squad to represent Mexico at the U-20 World Cup in Poland.

Career statistics

Club

Notes

References

1999 births
Living people
Mexican footballers
Mexico under-20 international footballers
Association football midfielders
Club Necaxa footballers
Liga MX players
Tercera División de México players
Footballers from Guadalajara, Jalisco